An agape feast or lovefeast (also spelled love feast or love-feast, sometimes capitalized) is a communal meal shared among Christians. The name comes from agape, a Greek term for 'love' in its broadest sense.

The lovefeast custom originated in the early Church and was a time of fellowship for believers. The Eucharist was often a part of the lovefeast, although at some point (probably between the latter part of the 1st century AD and 250 AD), the two became separate. Thus, in modern times the Lovefeast refers to a Christian ritual meal distinct from the Lord's Supper. The lovefeast seeks to strengthen the bonds and the spirit of harmony, goodwill, and congeniality, as well as to forgive past disputes and instead love one another.

Similar communal meals are attested also in the Apostolic tradition often attributed to Hippolytus of Rome, who does not use the term agape, and in works of Tertullian, who does. The connection between such substantial meals and the Eucharist had virtually ceased by the time of Cyprian (died 258), when the Eucharist was celebrated with fasting in the morning and the agape in the evening. The Synod of Gangra in 340 makes mention of lovefeasts in relation to a heretic who had barred his followers from attending them.

Though still mentioned in the Quinisext Council of 692, the agape fell into disuse soon after, except among the churches in Ethiopia and India. At the end of the 18th century the Carmelite friar Paolino da San Bartolomeo reported that the ancient Saint Thomas Christians of India still celebrated the lovefeast, using their typical dish called appam. In addition, Radical Pietist groups originating in the eighteenth-century, such as the Schwarzenau Brethren and the Moravian Church, celebrate the lovefeast. Methodist churches also continue the practice.

The practice has been revived more recently among other groups, including Anglicans, as well as the American house church movement. The modern lovefeast has often been used in ecumenical settings, such as between Methodists and Anglicans.

History

Early Christianity
The earliest reference to a meal of the type referred to as agape is in Paul the Apostle's First Epistle to the Corinthians, although the term can only be inferred vaguely from its prominence in 1 Cor 13. Many New Testament scholars hold that the Christians of Corinth met in the evening and had a common meal including sacramental action over bread and wine.  indicates that the rite was associated with participation in a meal of a more general character. It apparently involved a full meal, with the participants bringing their own food but eating in a common room. Perhaps predictably enough, it could at times deteriorate into merely an occasion for eating and drinking, or for ostentatious displays by the wealthier members of the community, as happened in Corinth, drawing the criticisms of Paul: "I hear that when you come together as a church, there are divisions among you, and to some extent I believe it. No doubt there have to be differences among you to show which of you have God's approval. When you come together, it is not the Lord's Supper you eat, for as you eat, each of you goes ahead without waiting for anybody else. One remains hungry, another gets drunk. Don't you have homes to eat and drink in? Or do you despise the church of God and humiliate those who have nothing?"

Soon after the year 100, Ignatius of Antioch refers to the agape feast. In Letter 97 to Trajan in 112, Pliny the Younger mentions that Christians are known to assemble for a common meal which may be the agape meal: The rescheduling of the agape meal was triggered by Corinthian selfishness and gluttony. Tertullian too seems to write of these meals, though what he describes is not quite clear.

Clement of Alexandria (c. 150–211/216) distinguished so-called agape meals of luxurious character from the agape (love) "which the food that comes from Christ shows that we ought to partake of". Accusations of gross indecency were sometimes made against the form that more indulgent banquets took. Referring to Clement of Alexandria's Stromata (III, 2), Philip Schaff commented: "The early disappearance of the Christian agapæ may probably be attributed to the terrible abuse of the word here referred to, by the licentious Carpocratians. The genuine agapæ were of apostolic origin (2 Pet. ii. 13; Jude 12), but were often abused by hypocrites, even under the apostolic eye (1 Corinthians 11:21).

Augustine of Hippo also objected to the continuance in his native North Africa of the custom of such meals, in which some indulged to the point of drunkenness, and he distinguished them from proper celebration of the Eucharist: "Let us take the body of Christ in communion with those with whom we are forbidden to eat even the bread which sustains our bodies." He reports that even before the time of his stay in Milan, the custom had already been forbidden there.

Canons 27 and 28 of the Council of Laodicea (364) restricted the abuses of taking home part of the provisions and of holding the meals in churches. The Third Council of Carthage (393) and the Second Council of Orléans (541) reiterated the prohibition of feasting in churches, and the Trullan Council of 692 decreed that honey and milk were not to be offered on the altar (Canon 57), and that those who held love feasts in churches should be excommunicated (Canon 74).

The ancient Saint Thomas Christians of India continued to celebrate their agapa feasts, using their typical dish called appam.

Medieval Georgia
In the medieval Georgian Orthodox Church, the term agapi referred to a commemorative meal or distribution of victuals, offered to clergymen, the poor, or passers-by, accompanying the funeral service on the anniversary of the deceased. The permanent celebration of these meals was assured by legacies and foundations.

Reformation
After the Protestant Reformation there was a move amongst some groups of Christians to try to return to the practices of the New Testament Church. One such group was the Schwarzenau Brethren (1708) who counted a Love Feast consisting of Feet-washing, the Agape Meal, and the Eucharist among their "outward yet sacred" ordinances. Another was the Moravians led by Count Zinzendorf who adopted a form consisting of the sharing of a simple meal, and then testimonies or a devotional address were given and letters from missionaries read.

John Wesley, the founder of Methodism, travelled to America in the company of Moravians and greatly admired their faith and practice. After his conversion in 1738 he introduced the Love Feast to what became known as the Methodist movement. Due to the lack of ordained ministers within Methodism, the Love Feast took on a life of its own, as there were very few opportunities to take Holy Communion. As such, the Primitive Methodists celebrated the Love Feast, before it lessened in the nineteenth century as the revival cooled.

Practice by denomination

Oriental Orthodox 
At least some of the Oriental Orthodox churches continue the tradition of this meal, including the Saint Thomas Christians of India. Their Lovefeasts are attended by individuals who travel great distances for it, and are presided over by a priest. They are often held when a new priest is ordained and those in attendance bring gifts for him. The Ethiopian Orthodox Church has also continued to celebrate the agape feast, which is held every Saturday, and many Coptic Orthodox churches celebrate it as well.

Brethren 
The Schwarzenau Brethren groups (the largest being the Church of the Brethren) regularly practice agape feasts (called "Love Feast"), which include feetwashing, a supper, and communion, with hymns and brief scriptural meditations interspersed throughout the worship service.

Groups that descend from the Schwarzenau Brethren such as the Church of the Brethren, Brethren Church, Old German Baptist Brethren, and Dunkard Brethren regularly practice a Lovefeast based on New Testament descriptions of the Last Supper of Christ. The Brethren combine the Agape meal (often consisting of lamb or beef and a bowl of soup) with a service of feetwashing before the meal and communion afterward. The term "Lovefeast" in this case generally refers to all three ordinances, not just the meal. Influenced by German Radical Pietists during the early 18th century, the Lovefeast was instituted among Brethren before Moravians adopted the practice.

Moravian 

The lovefeast of the Moravian Church is based on the Agape feast and the meals of the early churches described in the Bible in the Acts of the Apostles, which were partaken in unity and love. Traditionally for European, Canadian, and American lovefeasts, a sweetened bun and coffee (sweetened milky tea in Germany, the Netherlands, and England) is served to the congregation in the pews by dieners (from the German for 'servers'); before partaking, a simple table grace is said. The foods and drinks consumed from congregation may vary, adapted from what the congregations have available. Services in some Colonial-era lovefeasts, for example, used plain bread and water; some in Salem were known to have served beer.

The Moravian lovefeast also concentrates on the singing of hymns and listening to music which may come from the organ or choir. The songs and hymns chosen usually describe love and harmony. The congregation can talk quietly with their fellow brothers and sisters in Christ about their spiritual walk with God. Christmas Eve lovefeasts can become particularly spectacular in the congregation's choice of music and instrumentation. Many churches have trombone choirs or church bands play before a lovefeast as a call to service.

A Moravian congregation may hold a lovefeast on any special occasion, such as the date their church was founded, but there are certain established dates that Lovefeasts are regularly observed. Some of these notable dates include Watch Night, Good Friday, the Festival of 13 August (the 1727 date on which the Moravian Church was renewed or reborn), and Christmas Eve, where each member of the congregation receives a lighted candle at the end of the service in addition to the bun and coffee.

Methodist 

Methodists also practice lovefeasts, often quarterly, as well as on the evenings of major feast days. They are also held during camp meetings. In Methodist theology, lovefeasts are a "means of grace" and "converting ordinance" that John Wesley believed to be an apostolic institution. One account from July 1776 expounded on attendees' experiences of new birth and entire sanctification at a lovefeast:

The liturgy for a lovefeast traditionally includes the following elements:

In certain Methodist connexions, such as the Missionary Methodist Church and the New Congregational Methodist Church, footwashing is practiced too.

In the Wesleyan Methodist Church, lovefeasts consisted of bread and water that filled the loving-cup. These lovefeasts were said to "promote piety, mutual affection and zeal". Unlike the Eucharist in the Methodist tradition, lovefeasts are traditionally fenced, being only for members of Methodist churches, though non-members are permitted to attend once. Several Methodist hymns were written for this Christian ritual, including Charles Wesley's "The Love-Feast", penned in 1740:

The Christian liturgical books of the African Methodist Episcopal Church, African Methodist Episcopal Zion Church, Christian Methodist Episcopal Church, and United Methodist Church all have services for the Lovefeast.

Congregations of the Primitive Methodist Church hold Lovefeasts in the form of large potluck-style meals among members of their congregations.

¶108 of the Discipline of the Evangelical Wesleyan Church states that "A Love feast shall be held on each circuit at least once in three months. It shall ordinarily consist of bread-breaking, praise, and testimony."

¶244 of the Discipline of the Allegheny Wesleyan Methodist Connection stipulates that one of the duties of pastors is "to hold love-feasts".

Eastern Orthodox 
A number of Eastern Orthodox Christian parishes will have an agape meal (Turkish: sevgi ziyafeti), commonly known as coffee hour (Spanish: café comunitario), on Sundays and feast days following the Divine Liturgy, and especially at the conclusion of the Paschal Vigil.

Roman Catholic 
The agape is a common feature used by the Catholic Neocatechumenal Way in which members of the Way participate in a light feast after the celebration of the Eucharist on certain occasions.

Adventist 
The Creation Seventh Day Adventists partake of an agape feast as a part of their New Moon observances, taking the form of a formal, all-natural meal held after the communion supper.

Notes

References

Bibliography
 
 Bowman, Carl F. Brethren Society: The Cultural Transformation of a Peculiar People. Baltimore: Johns Hopkins University Press.
 Stutzman, Paul Fike. Recovering the Love Feast: Broadening Our Eucharistic Celebrations. Eugene, Oregon: Wipf and Stock, 2011.

External links

Archived at Ghostarchive and the Wayback Machine: 

Christian terminology
Eucharist
Methodism
New Testament Greek words and phrases
Schwarzenau Brethren
Protestant worship and liturgy
Traditions of the Moravian Church
Church of the Brethren
Communal eating